Arques (Languedocien: Arcas) is a commune in the Aude department in the Occitanie region of southern France.

The inhabitants of the commune are known as Arquois or Arquoises

Geography

Arques is located in the Pyrénées mountains some 25 km south-east of Limoux and 25 km north-east of Quillan. Access to the commune is by the D613 road from Serres in the west passing through the village and continuing to Albières in the east. The D54 goes north from the village to Valmigère. At the commune border the D70 branches from the D54 and follows a tortuous route to Bouisse. The commune is an alpine commune with rugged terrain but with some farms in the valley.

The Rialsesse river flows through the centre of the commune and the village from east to west gathering many tributaries. In the south the Ruisseau de Lait, with many tributaries rising in the commune, flows north-west into the Lac d'Arques (Arques Lake) which feeds the Rialsesse.

Neighbouring communes and villages

History
The area was owned by the Abbey of Lagrasse in the early 11th century, before coming under the control of the Lords of Termes. In 1231 the region was given by Simon de Montfort to Pierre de Voisins after the Albigensian Crusade. His successor, Gilles de Voisins, began the construction of the castle in 1280 and the organization of the Bastide. It was the northern barons who came to occupy the land of the Cathar heretics under the order of Pope Innocent III.
The dynasty of Voisins was extinguished in 1518 with the marriage of Françoise with Jean de Joyeuse, a member of the House of Joyeuse who therefore became the owner of the lordship and barony of Arques. Arques castle was abandoned in favour of the Château des Ducs de Joyeuse (Castle of the Dukes of Joyeuse) in Couiza. Lords and barons of Arques-barons were hereditary barons of Languedoc (Pays d'états) and had a permanent seat in the Estates of Languedoc.

Heraldry

Administration

List of Successive Mayors

Demography
In 2017 the commune had 254 inhabitants.

Sites and monuments

The commune has two sites that are registered as historical monuments:
The Arques Iron Cross (14th century)
The Château d'Arques (14th century)

Other sites of interest
The Déodat Roché House converted into an exhibition on Catharism
The Arboretum du Planel
A Sculpture of the Head of a Cleric (15th century) is registered as an historical object.
The Church contains several items that are registered as historical objects:
A Group Sculpture: Saint Anne, Virgin and child (14th century)
A Tabernacle and Altar seating in the south side chapel (17th century)
A Cross (14th century)
An Altar Cross and 6 Candlesticks (18th century)
A Retable and Tabernacle in the south side chapel (17th century)

Chateau d'Arques Picture Gallery

Notable people linked to the commune
Pierre de Voisins (1177-1233), Lord of Voisins-le-Bretonneux, then Limoux, Arques, Reddes, Caderonne, Couiza, and Bugarach. In 1191 he went on the Third Crusade. In 1209 he took part in the Albigensian Crusade. Lieutenant of Simon de Montfort who entrusted him with several lordships in Carcassonne and Razes after the fall of the Château de Termes. He was Baron of Arques.
Anne de Joyeuse (1560/1-1587), Baron of Arques, Viscount then Duke of Joyeuse.
Déodat Roché, born on 13 December 1877 at Arques, died on 12 January 1978, historian of Catharism, magistrate, philosopher, anthroposopher, freemason.
Victor Boffelli, born on 20 March 1947 at Arques, French rugby player

See also
Communes of the Aude department

References

External links
Page on the Chateau d'Arques on the cathares.org website 
 Page on the Chateau d'Arques on the AudeCathare.fr website 
Arques on Géoportail, National Geographic Institute (IGN) website 
Arques on the 1750 Cassini Map

Arques